Holger Greilich (born 12 July 1971) is a German former professional footballer who played as a defender. He played from 1989 to 2004, and made one appearance for the Germany B team.

References

External links
 

1971 births
Living people
German footballers
Association football defenders
Germany B international footballers
1. FSV Mainz 05 players
TSV 1860 Munich players
AC Omonia players
1. FC Saarbrücken players
Bundesliga players
2. Bundesliga players
Cypriot First Division players
German expatriate footballers
German expatriate sportspeople in Cyprus
Expatriate footballers in Cyprus
Sportspeople from Mainz